Posthuset (lit. "Post Office Building") may refer to:

Posthuset (Gothenburg)
Central Post Office Building (Stockholm)
Posthuset (station), Oslo, Norway